Nebria laticollis is a species of ground beetle in the Nebriinae subfamily that can be found in France, Italy, and Switzerland.

Subspecies
The species have 4 subspecies, 3 of which are endemic to France. The rest can be found in Italy and Switzerland, besides French mainland:
Nebria laticollis allobrogica Jeanne, 1976 France
Nebria laticollis fagniezi Jeannel, 1937 France
Nebria laticollis laticollis Dejean, 1826 France, Italy, Switzerland
Nebria laticollis maritima Jeanne, 1976 France

References

External links
Nebria laticollis at Carabidae of the World

lariollei
Beetles described in 1826
Beetles of Europe